Zelyony is a rural locality (a settlement) and the administrative center of Zelyonovskoye Rural Settlement, Bykovsky District, Volgograd Oblast, Russia. The population was 609 as of 2010. There are 10 streets.

Geography 
Zelyony is located on the left bank of the Volgograd Reservoir, 21 km south of Bykovo (the district's administrative centre) by road. Molodyozhny is the nearest rural locality.

References 

Rural localities in Bykovsky District